Victor Dmitrievich Zotov (16 September 1908 – 26 May 1977) was a New Zealand botanist.

Zotov was born in Vladivostok, Russian Empire and in 1924, together with his parents, immigrated to New Zealand, after the Russian Revolution. He attended Feilding Agricultural High School from 1925 to 1927, where he was taught by H.H.Allan, with whom he went to work in 1928 (having written his first scientific paper)  at the Plant Research Station in Palmerston North. In 1936 this became the Plant Research Bureau within the Department of Scientific and Industrial Research, and he continued working in the Botany Division of this organisation until his retirement in 1968.

Zotov's primary research interest was in New Zealand grasses, writing papers on canary grasses, Arundinoideae and especially Gramineae. He was also interested in the vegetation of the Tararua Ranges where he enjoyed tramping, and additionally published on soil erosion.

Selected publications
 (1928) Observations and experiments on the suckling clover content of the pastures on the school farm. Feilding Agricultural College Bulletin 7: 9-11
 
 pdf
 pdf</ref>
  pdf

Some published names 

 Chionochloa flavescens Zotov, New Zealand J. Bot. i. 97 (1963).
 Chionochloa antarctica (Hook.f.) Zotov, New Zealand J. Bot. i. 99 (1963).
 Erythranthera Zotov, New Zealand J. Bot. i. 124 (1963) (accepted name Rytidosperma Steud.)
 Notodanthonia Zotov, New Zealand J. Bot. i. 104 (1963) (accepted name Rytidosperma Steud.)
 Lachnagrostis lyallii (Hook.f.) Zotov, in Rec. Domin. Mus., N. Zeal. v. 142 (1965).

References

External links
Victor Zotov (photo Te Ara)

1908 births
1977 deaths
20th-century New Zealand botanists
People from Feilding
Soviet emigrants to New Zealand